Si Yaek Maha Nak is a sub-district (khwaeng) of Dusit district, Bangkok.

History
The name Si Yaek Maha Nak means "Maha Nak Intersection" or "Maha Nak Four Corners". It's a water intersection. This area is famous for its past floating market. The name "Maha Nak" is named after Khlong Maha Nak (คลองมหานาค; Maka Nak canal). The canal has a starting point at the Khlong Rop Krung (คลองรอบกรุง; lit: around the city canal), which is part of the old city moat (Rattanakosin Island), from Saphan Mahat Thai Uthit (Mahat Thai Uthit  bridge) near Ratchadamnoen avenue and then Mahakan fort passes through to the east. In this area it confluence with Khlong Phadung Krung Kasem (Phadung Krung Kasem canal) and  flowing continuously to meet with Khlong Saen Saep (Saen Saep canal) at Ban Khrua quarter. All of these canals were built in the early Rattanakosin period during the reigns of King Phutthayotfa Chulalok (Rama I), Nangklao (Rama III) and Mongkut (Rama IV). It was the main transport route of the people in those days. It was the centre of travel and trade by boat and connected to Chachoengsao province, eastern by Khlong Saen Saep. It became a floating market at the end of that era.

There's an incredible story behind this area's naming of "Si Yak Maha Nak", it is due to Mae Nak Phra Khanong, Thai female ghost, and was well known as being haunted by her inflating her body to a gigantic size here. And it's rumored that King Mongkut had visited to see her. (Maha is Thai loanword from Sanskrit महा (mahā) meaning the great).

At present Si Yak Maha Nak is still an important market, as in the past. It's the location of the Maha Nak Market, also known as  Saphan Khao Market, Bangkok's largest wholesale and retail fruits market. In addition, it's also adjacent to Bobae, wholesale and retail cheap clothes market located in Pom Prap Sattru Phai district.

Geography
Neighbouring sub-districts are (from the north clockwise): Suan Chitlada in its district (Phitsanulok and Nakhon Sawan roads are the divider lines), Thanon Phetchaburi of Ratchathewi district (Northern railway line is a divider line), Rong Mueang of Pathum Wan district (Khlong Saen Saep is a divider line), Khlong Maha Nak and Wat Sommanat of Pom Prap Sattru Phai district (Khlong Phadung Krung Kasem is a divider line), respectively.

It has a total area of 0.375 km2 (round about 0.14 mi2), considered as the smallest sub-district and the southernmost area of the district.

Places
 Maha Nak Market or Saphan Khao Market
Asia-Pacific International University:  Bangkok Campus
 Hall of Honour of The Prime Ministers & The National Council of Women of Thailand Under The Royal Patronage of Her Majesty The Queen (formerly Ban Managkasila)
Phitsanulok Mansion
Bangkok Adventist Hospital (Mission Hospital)

References 

Dusit district
Retail markets in Bangkok
Neighbourhoods of Bangkok
Subdistricts of Bangkok